Hulsberg (Limburgish: Hölsberg) is a village in the southeastern Netherlands. It is located in the municipality of Beekdaelen, Limburg, about 15 km east of Maastricht.

History 
The village was first mentioned in 1147 as Huleberga, and means "hill of holly (Ilex aquifolium)".

The Catholic St Clemens Church is a three aisled church from 1820. In 1908, Joseph Cuypers designed a new choir. The remainder was redesigned in 1930.

Hulsberg was home to 332 people in 1840. Until 1982, Hulsberg was a municipality of its own. After the re-arrangement of the municipalities in the Netherlands, Hulsberg and Schimmert were merged with the municipality of Nuth. In 2019, Nuth merged into Beekdaelen.

Hulsberg is popular stay-over place for Dutch. Its accommodations include two campings, and several hotels and motels). Hulsberg is only 3 kilometres from Valkenburg aan de Geul with several tourist attractions.

Hulsberg is the namesake of a radio mast, Zendmast Hulsberg, which is located in the territory of Valkenburg aan de Geul.

Gallery

Notable people
 Peter Akkermans, archaeologist (born 1957)
 Tjarco Cuppens, racing cyclist (born 1976)
 Jan Gerard Kerkherdere, Latinist (1677–1738)
 Ada Kok, swimmer (born 1947)
 Johannes Herman Frederik Umbgrove, geologist (1899–1954)

References

Populated places in Limburg (Netherlands)
Former municipalities of Limburg (Netherlands)
Beekdaelen